Dariusz Ludwig (born 25 February 1955 in Siemiatycze, Podlaskie) is a retired male decathlete from Poland. A member of Bałtyk Gdynia, he set his personal best (8222 points) on 12 July 1981 at a meet in Brussels.

Achievements

References
sports-reference
trackfield.brinkster

1955 births
Living people
Polish decathletes
Athletes (track and field) at the 1980 Summer Olympics
Olympic athletes of Poland
People from Siemiatycze County
Sportspeople from Podlaskie Voivodeship